Loxopholis osvaldoi is a species of lizard in the family Gymnophthalmidae. The species is endemic to Brazil.

Etymology
The specific name, osvaldoi, is in honor of Brazilian herpetologist Osvaldo Rodrigues da Cunha.

Geographic range
L. osvaldoi is found in the Brazilian states of Amazonas, Mato Grosso, Pará, and Rondônia.

Habitat
The natural habitat of L. osvaldoi is forest.

Reproduction
L. osvaldoi is oviparous.

References

Further reading
Ávila-Pires TCS (1995). "Lizards of Brazilian Amazonia (Reptilia: Squamata)". Zoologische Verhandelingen, Leiden 299: 1–706. (Leposoma osvaldoi, new species, p. 394). (in English, with abstracts in Portuguese and Spanish).
Goicoechea N, Frost DR, De la Riva I, Pelligrino KCM, Sites J Jr, Rodrigues MT, Padial JM (2016). "Molecular systematics of teioid lizards (Teioidea/Gymnophthalmoidea: Squamata) based on the analysis of 48 loci under tree-alignment and similarity-alignment". Cladistics 32 (6): 624–671. (Loxopholis osvaldoi, new combination, p. 670).
Ribeiro-Júnior MA, Amaral S (2017). "Catalogue of distribution of lizards (Reptilia: Squamata) from the Brazilian Amazonia. IV. Alopoglossidae, Gymnophthalmidae". Zootaxa 4269 (2): 151–196.

Loxopholis
Reptiles of Brazil
Endemic fauna of Brazil
Reptiles described in 1995
Taxa named by Teresa C.S. Ávila-Pires